FC Minsk is a professional football club based in Minsk, Belarus. They play in the Belarusian Premier League, the highest tier of Belarusian football. Their colours are red and navy blue.

History
The club was established in 2006 and was based on the Belarusian First League club Smena Minsk. FC Minsk took over Smena's license and was able to start immediately operating in the Belarusian First League without having to first play in the Second League, the third tier in Belarus. In the club's inaugural season in the First League, they were able to finish in first place guaranteeing them promotion to the Belarusian Premier League.

In their top tier debut season, FC Minsk showed weak performances and were relegated at end of 2007, but they managed to bounce straight back the following year with a dominant campaign in the Belarusian First League scoring 72 goals and failing to win in only 3 of the 26 games. 2008 therefore saw them once again competing in the Belarusian Premier League where they have remained ever since.

A 3rd-placed finish in 2010 saw FC Minsk embark on their first ever European campaign in the 2011–12 UEFA Europa League. In the first qualifying round, they were pitched against AZAL Baku of Azerbaijan and managed a 3–2 aggregate win over two legs. The second qualifying round saw them drawn against Gaziantepspor of Turkey. After a 1–1 draw at home, the away fixture in Gaziantep saw the Turkish side win 4–1 as the tie finished 5–2 on aggregate in favour of Gaziantepspor.

In 2013, FC Minsk changed their club crest for the current one. The same year they have qualified for the second qualifying round of the 2013–14 UEFA Europa League by winning Belarusian Cup. This campaign was more successful as Minsk first eliminated Valletta of Malta 3–1 on aggregate before beating the Scottish team St. Johnstone in the third qualifying round. After losing 0–1 at home, FC Minsk managed to win 1–0 in Perth and prevailed in penalty shootout 3–2, advancing to the play-offs, where they have lost to Standard Liège of Belgium 5–1 on aggregate.

Club crest
Upon their formation in 2006, FC Minsk adopted a simple white and blue crest which they kept for 7 years until 2013. In 2013, they changed their crest to the current red and navy blue.

Current squad
As of March 2023

League and Cup history

Honours
 Belarusian Premier League
 Third place (1): 2010
 Belarusian Cup
 Winners (1): 2013
 Runners-up (1): 2012

FC Minsk in Europe

Notes
 Home results are noted in bold.
 1Q: First qualifying round
 2Q: Second qualifying round
 3Q: Third qualifying round
 PO: Play-off round

European record

Managers
 Sergey Yaromko (Feb 23, 2006 – Oct 8, 2009)
 Vitali Tarakanov (Oct 8, 2009 – Oct 4, 2011)
 Andrey Downar (interim) (Oct 5, 2011 – Dec 12, 2011)
 Vadim Skripchenko (Dec 30, 2011 – Oct 12, 2013)
 Andrey Skorobogatko (interim) (Oct 13, 2013 – Dec 2, 2013)
 Andrey Skorobogatko (Dec 3, 2013 – June 3, 2014)
 Andrey Pyshnik (June 3, 2014–)

Women's team

The women's team of Minsk has won the Belarusian Premier League in 2013 and 2014, 2015, 2016, 2017, 2018, 2019. It also has won the Belarusian Women's Cup in 2011, 2013 and 2014.

References

External links
Official website
Page at UEFA.com
FC Minsk supporters site 

 
Football clubs in Minsk
Association football clubs established in 2006
2006 establishments in Belarus
Football clubs in Belarus